The Nevada Legislative Council Bureau is a Nevada state agency that provides legislative service, such as legal advice, fiscal information, and background research, for other Nevada state agencies or other U.S. governmental organizations. The agency is headed by an executive director, and the position is currently occupied by Brenda Erdoes. The Nevada Legislative Council Bureau is headquartered in Carson City, Nevada, and maintains an additional presence in Las Vegas, Nevada.

History 
The earliest form of the Nevada Legislative Council Bureau existed in 1963, with the creation of a legislative counsel. Since its founding, the agency is meant to be non-partisan and provides legislative service for any government staff who requires it. During this same year, the audit and fiscal division are still considered the same division, and the administrative division had yet to be created. In 1975, the audit division was separated from the fiscal division, but the latter did not become a separate division and was instead merged into the research division.

Structure 
Parts of the Nevada Legislative Council Bureau are the Legislative Committee and the Interim Finance Commission. The Legislative Commission consists of 12 members, while the Interim Finance Commission members are the Senate Committee on Finance and the Assembly Committee on Ways and Means from the preceding session.

The executive director of the agency reports to both boards. There are five divisions of the Nevada Legislative Council Bureau, which are the following:

 Administrative Division
 Audit Division
 Fiscal Division
 Legal Division
 Research Division

See also 

 Office of the Legislative Counsel
 Government of Nevada
 Legislative Council
 Legislative assembly

References

External links 
 Official website

State agencies of Nevada